Caherboshina is a townland situated approximately 4 kilometres from Dingle (Daingean Uí Chúis) in County Kerry, Ireland. Its position lies at the almost latitudal centre of Ireland's most westerly land-mass, Corcha Dhuibhne (the Dingle Peninsula).

References

Townlands of County Kerry